Deshadanakkili Karayarilla is a 1986 Indian Malayalam-language drama film written and directed by Padmarajan. It stars Mohanlal, Karthika, Shari and Urvashi. The film tells the story of two school girls who eloped while on a school trip. Though not commercially successful, it was critically well acclaimed, being one of the first Indian films that talked about womance.

Plot

Two young girls from a boarding school, Nirmala a.k.a. Nimmy (Karthika) and Sally (Shari), decide to slip away while on a school picnic. They believe that as troublemakers, they are not wanted at school or home. They see the world's resentment personified in a mean teacher named Devika (Urvashi), who is in charge of this particular picnic. The girls manage to escape and find a convent to stay at for the immediate night and a youth hostel soon after under the disguise that they are traveling college students. Meanwhile, Devika loses her job.

As the girls piece together a living doing odd jobs for the time being, they are befriended by a stranger, Harishankar (Mohanlal) towards whom Nimmy begins to develop an infatuation. Sally is jealous of Hari and his influence on Nimmy; she initially tries to protect her friend but finally accedes, not wanting to be a hindrance to her friend's choice. After a while, Nimmy tells Hari the truth about her situation in return for him telling her the same. Hari is a suspended bank manager who lost his job because someone pretending to be the wife of a dead man tricked him into giving her the dead man's money in the bank. However, since his suspension, he has been anonymously receiving a fixed sum every month through post.

As Nimmy shows Hari her photo album, he realizes that this swindler was Devika. It also gives him an explanation as to why the money orders had stopped. They subsequently trace Devika, and Hari falls in love with her. He promises to get her job back because he has the kids. He will also be done with his suspension by then. Hari then knowingly manipulates Nimmy's love for him, though he says or does nothing more than leading her on. He expects her to be understating, thinking that she is just infatuated with him and too young. Hari brings up a position where Nimmy agrees to go back, thinking that he will then love her. Sally considers that Nimmy's choices are hers, but finally, the girls agree to Hari's proposition to mediate between them and Devika. In this meeting, Sally ends up outraged at Devika for no particular reason and storms out, refusing to go back to school. Nimmy agrees to convince her, but then things go south as Hari reveals that Devika is his fiancée.

Back at their hostel, Sally decides to flee and implores Nimmy to come with her, but she refuses. They then share an intimate goodbye. Sally then comes back halfway upon realizing that it is not fine. She then bangs open the room to find Nimmy about to commit suicide. They both break down and hug.

The next morning, Hari, Devika, and the whole school management comes to find that the two girls are in bed together. Unfortunately, they are dead. The last scene shows Hari, who sports a "What have I done?" expression.

Cast

 Mohanlal as Harishankar, a suspended bank manager
 Karthika as Nirmala a.k.a. Nimmy, the girl who falls in love with Hari
 Shari as Sally, the girl who plans things
 Urvashi as Devika, the mean schoolteacher
 Jalaja as another teacher and Devika's close friend
 Jagathy N. K. Achary
 Subramaniam
 Latheef
 Poojappura Radhakrishnan	 
 Dev
 Noor Jehan
 Mudavanmugal Krishnankutty
 Kunjumol
 Rajam K. Nair
 Omanayamma
 K. R. Savithri
 Shanthi
 Thara

Critical analysis
The movie is considered as the first Indian film which explored the theme of womance. In a 2018 interview, a queer and LGBTQ rights activist said while talking about LGBTQ depictions in Malayalam films: "... it's Deshadanakkili Karayarilla is a personal favourite. Not just the lesbian angle, there are a lot of factors that can be linked to the queer community. It's surprising the film depicted that considering it was only after 1990s that homosexuality was considered natural in our country. There is a lot of reading in that film. Shari is lesbian, she has cropped hair, loves her friend to the point of forsaking anything for her and is insanely jealous of Mohanlal's bond with her. While Karthika is unaware of this. Suicide rate is highest among queer people due to the lack of acceptance and here they both commit suicide. Shari keeps talking about taking her to a 'safe haven.' Like most queer people they also face neglect from their family at a young age and they keep running away from the world. And like them they keep moving to another place once their identity is revealed.".

Soundtrack
The music and background score were composed by Raveendran and the lyrics were written by O. N. V. Kurup.

Trivia
Though the film is not structured as a thriller, the mystery element in most of the story was highly acclaimed. It garnered very positive reviews from viewers as well as critics. Especially the introduction scene of Harishankar, where the character brings in a clear feeling of distrust for Sally and a very clear romantic feeling for Nirmala is notable for the air of mystery around Harishankar. Through the narrative, Padmarajan brings in a connection between Devika and Harishankar, which eventually leads to the suicide of the girls. The feeling Sally has for Nirmala is also described beautifully. The willful and disobedient Sally was ready to bend her decisions and views only for Nirmala. Though Nirmala decided to go back against her wishes, Sally never left Nirmala's side and was ready to be with her forever.

References

External links
 
 List of Malayalam films released in 1986 at www.prd.kerala.gov.in

1986 films
1980s Malayalam-language films
Lesbian-related films
Indian LGBT-related films
Indian drama films
Films with screenplays by Padmarajan
Films directed by Padmarajan